Palmer is an extinct town in Braxton County, in the U.S. state of West Virginia. The GNIS classifies it as a populated place.

History
A post office called Palmer was established in 1893, and remained in operation until 1941. The community was named after one Mr. Palmer, a businessperson in the lumber industry.

References

Ghost towns in West Virginia
Landforms of Braxton County, West Virginia